Black Journal is a 1977 Italian black comedy film directed by Mauro Bolognini. It is loosely based on real-life serial killer Leonarda Cianciulli, who killed three women between 1939 and 1940, and turned their bodies into soap and teacakes. It stars Shelley Winters, Max von Sydow, Renato Pozzetto and Alberto Lionello, with the latter three in a dual role as both the victims of the killer, in drag, and those who apprehend her.

Plot 
Lea, a mature Neapolitan woman who runs a lotto box office in a northern Italian city, had thirteen children, but all but one died from abortion or after a few months of life. The only survivor of her, Michele, is cared for by her with morbid affection: she is convinced that she has stolen him from Death by negotiating with it, so she is not willing to sell him either to the army or to another woman. When Michele gets engaged with a beautiful dance teacher, his mother, to avoid separation, makes a new sacrifice to Death, killing three spinster friends, from whom she makes soap and biscuits. The call to military service arrives for her son: to make him return home, Lea would like to multiply her sacrificial rites, targeting, this time, a mute servant and Michele's hated girlfriend. The carabinieri will stop her on time.

Cast

Production 
Mauro Bolognini was originally going to direct the film 15 years earlier, with Anna Magnani in the lead role. Later, he envisioned Sophia Loren as the leading actress. The film had several working titles from 1976 to 1977, including Black Journal, La cuoca del diavolo, Sapone di donna, Donne all'interno, La saponificatrice and La signora degli orrori.

Ornella Muti was cast as the girlfriend of Lea's son, but dropped out in June 1977 and was replaced by Laura Antonelli.

References

External links

1977 films
1977 comedy-drama films
1970s black comedy films
Comedy films based on actual events
Works about cannibals
Cultural depictions of female serial killers
Cultural depictions of Italian women
Drag (clothing)-related films
1970s Italian-language films
English-language Italian films
1970s English-language films
Films about Fascist Italy
Films about superstition
Films directed by Mauro Bolognini
Films with screenplays by Luciano Vincenzoni
Italian black comedy films
Italian serial killer films
1977 multilingual films
Italian multilingual films
1970s Italian films